Vecsési FC is a Hungarian football club located in Vecsés, Hungary. It currently plays in Hungarian National Championship III. The team's colors are red and white.

External links 
  
 Soccerway

 
Football clubs in Hungary
Association football clubs established in 1911
1911 establishments in Hungary